Doyle L. Niemann (born March 19, 1947) is an American prosecutor, public administrator, and former politician who represented District 47 in the Maryland House of Delegates from 2003 to 2015. He currently serves as Chief of Operations for the Prince George's County State's Attorney's Office in the administration of State's Attorney Aisha Braveboy.

Background

Delegate Nieman was born in Grand Island, Nebraska on March 19, 1947. He was a Regents Scholar at the University of Nebraska where he attended from 1965 to 1967. He then graduated from the University of Texas with a B.A. in government in 1969 and was a member of the Phi Beta Kappa honor society. Teaching fellowship, Graduate School of Government, University of Texas, 1970. University of Maryland School of Law, J.D., 1997 (Order of Coif; Editor, Maryland Law Review). He was admitted to the Maryland Bar in 1997. An Assistant State's Attorney for Prince George's County since 1998, Delegate Niemann currently specializes in prosecuting economic and white-collar crimes.  He previously served on the Mount Rainier City Council (1983–1987), the Maryland Democratic Committee (1986–1990), and the Prince George's County Board of Education (1996–2002). He lives in Mount Rainier.

In the legislature

Member of House of Delegates since January 8, 2003. Member, Environmental Matters Committee, 2007- (environment subcommittee, 2007-; housing & real property subcommittee, 2007-; natural resources subcommittee, 2007-; chair, ground rent work group, 2007-).

Delegate Neiman has been instrumental in legislation addressing consumer economic issues including the 2005 enactment of the Protection of Homeowners in Foreclosure Act (PHIFA) and the 2008 efforts to modernize Maryland's draconian foreclosure procedures.  PHIFA was one of the very early attempts by a state to end what is commonly known as a foreclosure rescue scheme (or fraud).  PHIFA has been the model for other states fighting these frauds.  In 2008, Delegate Niemann was once again a leader in the House in the successful fight to strengthen the standards for mortgage brokers, to make substantial changes to the Maryland procedures for foreclosures that protected consumers, and to improve PHIFA.  Notably, these financial measures were taken months before the majority of Americans were aware of the financial crisis that hit the nation in the fall of 2008.

Legislative notes
 voted for the Clean Indoor Air Act of 2007 (HB359)
 voted against slots in 2005 (HB1361)
 voted in favor the Tax Reform Act of 2007(HB2)
 voted in favor of prohibiting ground rents in 2007(SB106)
 voted in favor of in-state tuition for illegal immigrants in 2007 (HB6)

Past elections
2006 Race for Maryland House of Delegates – 47th District
Voters to choose three:
{| class="wikitable"
|-
!Name
!Votes
!Percent
!Outcome
|-
|- 
|Jolene Ivey, Democratic
|12,860
|  35.5%
|   Won
|-
|- 
|Victor R. Ramirez, Democratic
|12,231 
|  33.6%
|   Won
|-
|- 
|Doyle L. Niemann, Democratic
|11,229
|  30.8%
|   Won
|-
|- 
|Other write-ins
|120
|  .3%
|   
|-
|}

2010 Race for Maryland House of Delegates – 47th District
Voters to choose three:
{|class="wikitable"
|-
!Name
!Votes
!Percent
!Outcome
|-
|- 
|Jolene Ivey, Democratic
|14,404
|  35.4%
|   Won
|-
|- 
|Michael G. Summers, Democratic
|12,337
|  30.3%
|   Won
|-
|- 
|Doyle L. Niemann, Democratic
|11,925
|  29.3%
|   Won
|-
|- 
|Rachel Audi, Republican
|1,853
|  4.6%
|   
|-
|- 
|Anthony Cicoria, Democratic (Write in)
|63
|  0.2%
|   
|-
|Other write-ins
|87
|  0.2%
|   
|-
|}

References

Democratic Party members of the Maryland House of Delegates
University of Nebraska alumni
1947 births
Living people
People from Grand Island, Nebraska
People from Mount Rainier, Maryland
21st-century American politicians